Formula 600 (F600) is a Sports Car Club of America (SCCA) and Midwestern Council of Sports Car Clubs (MCSCC) open wheel road racing class.

Formula 600 was originally introduced in the early 1980s as Formula 440 (F440) and continued as Formula 500 (F500) through the 2022 season before being renamed to Formula 600 (F600), and is a closely regulated class.  Several chassis manufacturers produce different designs to a tight dimensional ruleset.  Engines are specified by the ruleset, and builders are not allowed to modify engine internals.  Instead of traditional dampers and springs, F500 cars utilize a very simple elastomeric spring medium contained in a cylindrical canister.  The rules state the elastomer must be 2" in diameter by 1" in thickness,  but the design and implementation of the elastomeric springs (commonly called "pucks" by the competitors) is wide open. Additionally, each chassis manufacturer produces bodywork of their own design, which adheres to dimensional constraints.  These regulations allow for very competitive racing at a relatively low cost, which rewards driver and car set-up skills. In 2023, the class was renamed to Formula 600.

F600 engines

Formula 600 cars are powered by a two-cylinder, water-cooled two-stroke engine or a four-stroke 600cc motorcycle engine. Modern cars use either the Rotax 494, or Rotax 493 originally produced for Ski-Doo snowmobiles. Motorcycle-engined cars use the Honda CBR600RR, the Suzuki GSXR600, or the Yamaha R6 engine. Older cars, mostly used for Solo events these days use the Kawasaki 440/A engine. The AMW 500L-85/250-2 R2c engine, while legal for use in Formula 500 racing, is rarely used these days.

The SCCA also now allows the use of 600cc motorcycle engines with a sequential transmission as an alternative to the two-stroke engines. The usage of this engine requires a 28mm intake restrictor and a higher minimum weight of 900 pounds for the car in order to keep performance the same as the two-stroke powered cars. Cars using these engines are often unofficially referred to as Formula 600 cars, although they still race in the same Formula 500 class.

The Kawasaki 440/A engine, produced by Kawasaki, is a 436 cc piston port engine utilizing 38 mm Mikuni VM series carburetors and a tuned dual exhaust. While this engine is no longer competitive in road racing, it is still widely used in Solo II and Autocross events. Like all F500 engines, except for the AMW, the Kawasaki was originally produced as a snowmobile engine. It has been out of production since the early 1980s. Parts for these engines are becoming more difficult to find.

The AMW 500L-85 engine, built by Two Stroke International was introduced to F500 in 1994. It is a 497 cc reed valve engine using twin 38 mm Mikuni SuperBN carburetors. To keep the performance of these larger, more powerful engines in line with prior engines, SCCA mandates the use of a spec Y exhaust manifold and single tuned pipe on the AMW engine. Unlike the other engines used in F600, the AMW engine is a derivative of a light aircraft engine. This engine is no longer in production, and is not supported by the manufacturer.

Introduced for the 1997 season was the Rotax 494 engine. Rotax builds racing and industrial engines for a wide variety of applications, including aircraft, motorcycles, go-karts, snowmobiles and watercraft, The Rotax 494 engine is a 499cc rotary-valve engine. Like the AMW, the Rotax utilizes a 2 into 1 "Y" exhaust manifold and a single tuned expansion chamber exhaust. The Rotax engine utilizes the same 38 mm Mikuni VM carburetors as the Kawasaki. The Rotax engine has become, by far, the most popular engine in F500 road racing. The Rotax 494 went out of production for Ski-Doo following the 2000 model year. Ski-Doo/Rotax ended support for it shortly thereafter. Some parts however, are still available through dealers and online outlets.

In 2004 SCCA added the Rotax 493 to the list of approved engines. The 493 has the same bore and stroke as the 494. However, unlike the 494, is a reed valve engine. It also runs Mikuni VM series carbs and the "Y" exhaust manifold like its cousin the 494. Cars running the 493 engine are required to run at a higher minimum weight to maintain parity with the older 494 and AMW engines. Like the 494, the 493 also went out of production for Ski-Doo following the 2003 model year. Support for it ended in 2007. As with the 494, some parts are still available through dealers and online outlets.

In 2011 SCCA added the Rotax 593 to the list of approved engines. The 593, (more commonly known as the Ski-Doo 500ss) is a 600cc version of the reed valve 493 engine. It also runs Mikuni VM series carbs and the "Y" exhaust manifold like the other Rotax engines, but are required to run a specified intake restrictor to keep power output on par with the 500cc 493 engine. Cars running the 593 engine are also required to run at a higher minimum weight to maintain parity with the older 494 and AMW engines. The 593 remains in production for Ski-Doo to date, rebadged from "500ss" to "600" in 2010.

In 2021 SCCA allowed the use of the rotax 593HO or high output.

Engine specifications are tightly regulated by the SCCA. No engine modifications are permitted in formula 600. Engines must be run in stock form "as delivered" from the factory. No aftermarket parts, port modifications, or other variations from stock configuration are allowed. This helps keep costs down and means close competition on the track.

F600 transmission

Two-stroke F600 cars use an advanced Continuously Variable Transmission (CVT), similar to that used in snowmobiles.

These simple belt driven automatic transmissions are tuned to optimize the power curve of a two-stroke engine, constantly keeping the engine at its peak power. One of the key benefits of the CVT is that it is a stepless transmission. This allows all of the engine's power to be transmitted to the drive wheels at all times.

Motorcycle-engined cars use the same sequential transmission used in the motorcycle that the engine came from. This is typically operated by paddle shifters attached to the steering column.

SCCA National Championship Runoffs History
The SCCA National Championship Runoffs has crowned Formula 500 National Champions since 1997. The original Formula 440 class competed at the SCCA Runoffs from 1984 - 1996.

References

External links

http://racingthef500.com] Non-commercial and most active online forum dedicated to the current SCCA Formula 500 class
F500.us Non-commercial and most active online forum dedicated to the current SCCA Formula 500 class. Includes category specific technical forums dedicated to engines, chassis, and CVT tuning. As well as general, news, event specific, and classifieds forums.
Formula500.org  Formula 500 community run by eformulacarnews.com. Contains information pertaining to current happenings, technical info, how-to's, event news and a classifieds section
The Formula 500 Racing Web  Now inactive former unofficial home page of SCCA F500 racing. The archived mailing list is a good historical resource of information.
The Sports Car Club of America is the major sanctioning organization that runs F500 races in the United States.
Formula 500 on YouTube Joe Palmer's YouTube Channel of Formula 500 In-Car Videos, and Slideshows.

500